is a retired Japanese judoka.

Nanjo was born in Uji, Kyoto, and began judo at the age of 5. She belonged to Daicolo Co.,Ltd. after graduating from University of Tsukuba in 1995.

In 1997, she participated in the World Championships but was defeated by Carolina Mariani from Argentina. In 1998, she also participated in the Asian Games held in Bangkok and won a bronze medal.

Nanjo was good at Seoi nage, Tomoe nage and Newaza, learned by Shōzō Fujii at Tenri University. She was known as a rival of Noriko Narazaki who is a classmate of the same university and former world champion.

As of 2010, Nanjo coaches judo at Sendai University with her husband.

Achievements
1989 - All-Japan High School Championships (-48 kg) 1st
1990 - All-Japan High School Championships (-48 kg) 1st
1991 - All-Japan Selected Championships (-48 kg) 3rd
1992 - All-Japan Selected Championships (-48 kg) 3rd
1993 - Fukuoka International Women's Championships (-52 kg) 2nd
1994 - All-Japan Selected Championships (-52 kg) 3rd
 - All-Japan University Championships (-52 kg) 1st
1995 - All-Japan Businessgroup Championships (-52 kg) 1st
1996 - Asian Championships (-52 kg) 2nd
 - Fukuoka International Women's Championships (-52 kg) 1st
 - All-Japan Selected Championships (-52 kg) 2nd
 - All-Japan Women's Weight Class Championships (-52 kg) 1st
 - All-Japan Businessgroup Championships (-52 kg) 1st
1997 - East Asian Games (-52 kg) 1st
 - Fukuoka International Women's Championships (-52 kg) 1st
 - All-Japan Selected Championships (-52 kg) 1st
1998 - Asian Games (-52 kg) 3rd
 - All-Japan Selected Championships (-52 kg) 1st
1999 - Asian Championships (-52 kg) 3rd
 - Fukuoka International Women's Championships (-52 kg) 2nd
 - Otto Super World cup Hamburg (-52 kg) 2nd
 - All-Japan Selected Championships (-52 kg) 1st
 - All-Japan Women's Weight Class Championships (-57 kg) loss
2000 - Aral Grand Prix Prague (-52 kg) loss
 - All-Japan Women's Weight Class Championships (-52 kg) 5th
2001 - Pacific Rim Championships (-52 kg) 1st
 - Aral Grand Prix Prague (-52 kg) 1st
 - All-Japan Selected Championships (-52 kg) 3rd

References

Japanese female judoka
People from Kyoto Prefecture
1972 births
Living people
Asian Games medalists in judo
Judoka at the 1998 Asian Games
Asian Games bronze medalists for Japan
Medalists at the 1998 Asian Games
20th-century Japanese women
21st-century Japanese women